The ESB Business School (formerly ESB Reutlingen) is Reutlingen University's business school founded in 1971 and based in Baden-Württemberg, Germany. Since 2008, the school is responsible for all business and production management related degree programs of the university.  The school offers 17 undergraduate and graduate programs as well as double degree programs in cooperation with numerous other business schools from around the world. The ESB Business School ranks among the top business schools in Germany and belongs to the five percent of all business schools worldwide who have earned the AACSB accreditation.

Undergraduate programs

Single degree programs
 Bachelor of Science (Wirtschaftsingenieurwesen - Sustainable Production and Business) in 3 1/2 years 
 Bachelor of Science (Internationales Wirtschaftsingenieurwesen - Operations) in 3 1/2 years

Double degree programs

Bachelor of Science in International Management Double Degree
Bachelor of Science in International Management and a second bachelor's degree of a partner university within the International Partnership of Business Schools in 4 years.

Bachelor of Science in International Business
The International Business (IB) program, offers students the possibility of acquiring within only four years the degrees Bachelor of Science (BSc) and Master of Business Administration (MBA) or another master's degree (MSc/MA). Students complete three and a half academic years at Reutlingen University, including a practical internship and a study abroad semester.

Graduate programs

MSc

Master of Science in International Accounting, Controlling and Taxation 
This Master of Science program prepares students for a management career in accounting, finance and controlling with an international focus. Usually, all semesters of the program are spent at the ESB Reutlingen.

Master of Science in International Business Development 
This program focuses on the transfer of practice-oriented, detailed knowledge to the development of new business ideas.

Master of Science in Global Management and Digital Competencies 
The ESB also offers a one-year Master of Science in Global Management and Digital Competencies. One semester of the program is spent at the ESB in Reutlingen, the other semester at one of four international partner schools from the International Partnership of Business Schools (IPBS) network.

Master of Science in Operations Management 
ESB currently offers a two-year MSc program: Master of Science in Operations Management, with its main focus on the interface of business and technology.

Master of Science in Digital Industrial Management and Engineering 
The MSc Digital Industrial Management and Engineering is the ESB's research master's program.

MA

Master of Arts in European Management Studies 
A trilingual (German, French, English) Master of Arts in European Management Studies is offered. In this two-year program students spend one year in Reutlingen and one year in Strasbourg at the Ecole de Management de Strasbourg and receive two master's degrees.

MBA
The ESB offers a full-time and part-time MBA program focused on International Management.

The MBA program can be completed full-time in two semesters (full-time program) or five semesters (part-time program).

History

In 1971, the faculty of Foreign Economics was founded at Reutlingen University from which the faculties School of International Business (SIB) and Production Management (initially: the Manufacturing Department) derived. The Manufacturing Department commenced in 1973. The European School of Business (ESB) was founded as an independent faculty by Prof. Dr. Hans Tümmers with the goal of internationalising and renewing the German Management qualification. The first partner universities were the Reims Management School in Reims (France), as well as the Middlesex University in London (United Kingdom.)

On 1 June 2008, the business faculties School of International Business (SIB), Production Management and the European School of Business of Reutlingen University were united as the new ESB Business School.

References

External links
  
  

European Business School
Reutlingen University
Educational institutions established in 1979
1979 establishments in West Germany